The 1937 Providence Friars football team was an American football team that represented Providence College as an independent during the 1937 college football season. In their fourth year under head coach Joe McGee, the team compiled a 2–6 record.

Schedule

References

Providence
Providence Friars football seasons
Providence Friars football